The Paperboy is a 1994 Canadian horror film starring Alexandra Paul, Marc Marut and William Katt.

Plot

The movie is set in 1994. Johnny McFarley, a satanic 12-year-old paperboy with a thirst for blood, arrives at elderly Mrs. Thorpe's home and asphyxiates the woman with a plastic bag.

The movie then cuts to her daughter, Melissa, a teacher making concluding remarks to her seventh grade English class. When Melissa returns home, she receives a phone call from her friend, Diana, who tells her that her mother has died. Melissa and her daughter, Cammie, travel back to Melissa's hometown for her mother's funeral. Once Melissa and Cammie arrive at the late Mrs. Thorpe's home, they are greeted by an enthusiastic Johnny, who kindly offers to take their luggage inside. Johnny asks permission to join them at the funeral. During the limousine ride to the funeral, Johnny reveals that his mother is dead and that his father, a sales representative, is rarely around because of the nature of his job. 

During the funeral, he and Cammie sneak inside the room at the funeral home where the caskets are kept. Johnny gets in one, which makes Cammie uncomfortable. He intimidates Cammie into keeping the secret by having her say with him: "Flesh to flesh, skin to skin. Tell the secret and die for your sin!"

After the funeral, Johnny sneaks into the Thorpe house and places a baby monitor in the vent so he can eavesdrop. Later, Melissa invites Johnny to a barbecue that she and Cammie are having, in which Johnny accepts under the condition that he is allowed to cook. Johnny takes a video of the BBQ while he waits for Melissa, only to discover that she is going on a date with her boyfriend, Brian. When Brenda arrives to babysit Cammie, Johnny reacts violently by smashing a barbecue plate and then runs home.

Later that night, Johnny walks back to Melissa's house with a letter of apology, only to stumble upon Brenda making out with her boyfriend. Brenda catches him and, the next morning, tells Melissa that Johnny has been spying on her. Brenda catches Johnny on his bicycle and sprays him with a water hose. That night, Johnny seeks revenge by snapping wires to the antenna that Brenda uses to sneak into her bedroom window without her parents knowing. Johnny is successful in his scheme, which causes Brenda to fall and injure herself. The next morning, Johnny later explains casually to Melissa and Diana that Brenda broke her neck and is now paraplegic.

When Johnny takes Cammie along to collect money from his paper route, he tells her that one of his customers, Mrs. Rosemont, is a witch. When Johnny walks away from Cammie to retrieve his money from the mailbox, Mrs. Rosemont warns Cammie that Johnny is "not right in the head". He has the mark, the Mark of Cain and that she should stay away from him. Later, Cammie tells her mother what was revealed to her when she was with Johnny collecting money. Concerned, Melissa confronts Mrs. Rosemont. Rosemont said she was only telling Cammie to be on her guard and also "That McFarley boy, he's bad!"

Johnny sneaks into Melissa's house in order to make an apple pie. He tells Melissa that his mom always made him an apple pie when he behaved. Melissa is not pleased about this. She tells Johnny she is not his mother and tells him to leave. Johnny gets mad and breaks the plate the apples laid on. He then pulls back the knife as if he was going to stab Melissa and Cammie, but instead stabs the table and gives them an evil look. Later that night, Johnny, along with his father, apologizes for his actions. Melissa tells Johnny that he cannot come to the house unless he is invited. She then tells his father that he should spend more time with him. Johnny's father gives his son a set of golf clubs as an apology for not being there for him, and tells Johnny that they will be spending much more time together in California because of a recent promotion. Fearing that he will not see what he considers to be "his family" again, Johnny kills his father with a fold-out putter, declaring he already has a new life.

Soon, Melissa goes to Mrs. Rosemont, where it is explained that Johnny was emotionally and physically abused by his mother, who went by the Word of God her entire life and tried to raise her son with discipline in spite of his incorrigible attitude and constant resistance, and that he murdered her by pushing her down the stairs in the cellar of their house. Melissa calls Brian and tells him that they can remove Johnny from his house and have him placed in foster care if they can prove that he's either neglected or abused. When Johnny finds out about their conversation (owing to his eavesdropping device), he grows angry and rides his bike to Mrs. Rosemont's house. He snatches her inhaler and leads her to believe that he killed her dog - he actually smashed ketchup bottles while the dog was in a different room completely fine. Unable to breathe without her inhaler, Mrs. Rosemont has a fatal asthma attack.

Johnny then goes to Brian's workplace, knocks him out with a baseball bat, and sets him on fire with gasoline, having despised Brian because earlier in the movie, Johnny asked if he could tag along when Brian asked to take Melissa and Cammie out for pizza. Brian told him "Not tonight, slugger. Shouldn’t you be out with some friends of your own age playing ball or something?" However, unknown to Johnny, Brian manages to regain consciousness fast enough to escape. Johnny then calls Melissa and tells her to come to his house. Melissa denies Johnny's request until she hears Cammie calling her name. Johnny's true intentions are finally unveiled when he reveals that he killed Melissa's mother to lure them to the house in hopes of starting a new family. Melissa frantically searches Johnny's house wherever she hears Cammie's voice only to find that the sound has been coming from Johnny's home movie and the baby monitor in the basement. Ultimately, Melissa incessantly refuses to be Johnny's mother and declares that she and the rest of the family hate him. Enraged, Johnny then tries to bury Melissa in a hole created for his father, only to have her escape through the window.

Armed with a pickaxe, a satanical Johnny pursues Melissa and Cammie, intent on killing Melissa and Cammie as revenge for being rejected. Johnny and Melissa struggle with the pickaxe until the police arrive. Johnny tries to use this to his advantage, frantically lying, saying Melissa is crazy and tried to kill him, even saying she murdered his father. However, to his horror, Johnny sees Brian step out of the squad car, having already told the police the whole truth and saying that it's over. The cops arrest Johnny as he breaks down into a hysterical, tearful rage, begging in vain for Melissa to tell them that he is a good boy, while the cops have a talk with Melissa, Brian, and Cammie about the whole situation with Johnny as the film ends.

Cast
 Marc Marut as Johnny McFarley
 Alexandra Paul as Melissa Thorpe
 William Katt as Brian
 Karyn Dwyer as Brenda
 Krista Errickson as Diana
 Frances Bay as Mrs. Rosemont
 Brigid Tierney as Cammie Thorpe
 Barry Flatman as Mr. McFarley
 Derek Johnston as Brenda's Boyfriend
 Claire Riley as Jeanne Stalcup
 Jenny Campbell as Tiffany
 Mathieu Kermoyan as Uri
 Bobo Vian as Dora
 James Rae as Travis
 Frelin The Dog as Peaches The Dog
 Sam Stone (uncredited) as Police Sergeant

Production

Filming
Principal photography started on July 26, 1993, and ended on August 27, 1993.

See also
Cinema of Canada
The Bad Seed (1956 film)
Psychological horror
Horror-of-personality
Horror-of-demonic
Lists of films
Patricide
Sicko (disambiguation)

External links

1994 films
1994 horror films
1994 independent films
1990s psychological thriller films
Films set in 1994
Canadian horror thriller films
Canadian independent films
English-language Canadian films
Films about stalking
Home invasions in film
Films directed by Douglas Jackson
Patricide in fiction
Matricide in fiction
Films about mother–daughter relationships
1990s English-language films
1990s Canadian films